Greybeard is a science fiction novel by British author Brian Aldiss, published in 1964.

Plot summary
Set decades after the Earth's population has been sterilised as a result of nuclear bomb tests conducted in Earth's orbit, the book shows a world emptying of humans, with only an ageing, childless population left.
The story is mainly told through the eyes of Algernon "Algy" Timberlane (the titular Greybeard) and his wife, Martha.

Publishing history
Since its first publication by Faber & Faber and Harcourt, Brace and World in 1964, it has had numerous reprints and translations, including Romanian, Norwegian, Japanese, Dutch, Swedish, Slovenian, Polish, Hungarian, Portuguese, Czech, Danish, Spanish, German and French. It was included in the Gollancz science fiction reprint series, SF Masterworks.

Reception
The book is included in Interzone editor David Pringle's Science Fiction: The 100 Best Novels (1985).

References
Greybeard, Brian Aldiss. New York: Signet/New American Library, 1965. p. 2689

External links
Greybeard at Brian Aldiss website

Greybeard at fantasticfiction website
review at "My Science Fiction Life", BBC Four website
Aldiss video commentary on Greybeard at Meet the Author website

Novels by Brian Aldiss
1964 British novels
British science fiction novels
1964 science fiction novels
Post-apocalyptic novels
Faber and Faber books